Ana Maria Gonçalves (born 1970) is a Brazilian writer.

She was born in Ibiá, Minas Gerais. Gonçalves was a professor of English and then a publicist in São Paulo. In 2002, she decided to pursue writing full-time. Later that year she published her first novel Ao lado e à margem do que sentes por mim« ("Beside and at the edge of what you feel for me"). In 2006, she published the novel »Um defeito de cor« ("A color defect"); it received the Casa de las Américas Prize for the category Brazilian literature in 2007. In 2009, she was included in a list published by the newspaper O Globo of the best Brazilian books from the previous decade. Her short stories have been included in anthologies published in Portugal and Italy.

Gonçalves was writer in residence at Tulane University in 2007, at Stanford University in 2008 and at Middlebury College in 2009. As of 2019, she was living in New Orleans.

References 

1970 births
Living people
Brazilian women novelists
Brazilian expatriate academics in the United States
20th-century Brazilian women writers
21st-century Brazilian women writers
Tulane University faculty
Stanford University faculty
Middlebury College faculty
People from Minas Gerais
20th-century Brazilian novelists
21st-century Brazilian novelists
Public relations people